Javier Gutiérrez Berlinches (born 9 January 1988), commonly known as Guti, is a Spanish footballer who plays for CD Marchamalo as a winger.

Club career
Born in Guadalajara, Castile-La Mancha, Guti was a product of hometown CD Guadalajara's youth system, and made his senior debut in the 2007–08 season, in Segunda División B. In January 2008 he was loaned to CD Marchamalo from Tercera División, signing permanently in September.

On 2 July 2010, Guti joined Albacete Balompié, initially being assigned to the reserves also in the fourth level. On 8 May of the following year he appeared in his first game as a professional, starting in a 1–2 away loss against FC Barcelona B in the Segunda División.

On 2 August 2011, Guti moved to CF Fuenlabrada of the fourth division. He achieved promotion at the first attempt, scoring two goals in 34 matches.

Guti signed for third-tier club La Roda CF on 29 January 2015.

References

External links

1988 births
Living people
People from Guadalajara, Spain
Sportspeople from the Province of Guadalajara
Spanish footballers
Footballers from Castilla–La Mancha
Association football wingers
Segunda División players
Segunda División B players
Tercera División players
CD Guadalajara (Spain) footballers
Atlético Albacete players
Albacete Balompié players
CF Fuenlabrada footballers
La Roda CF players